John Robert Denike (November 22, 1903 – 1985) was a political figure in Saskatchewan. He represented Torch River from 1948 to 1952 in the Legislative Assembly of Saskatchewan as a Co-operative Commonwealth Federation (CCF) member.

He was born in Summerland, British Columbia, the son of Stephen Denike and Isla Sirman, and was educated there and in Victoria. In 1929, Denike married Delchen Gentner. He lived in Nipawin, Saskatchewan.

References 

Saskatchewan Co-operative Commonwealth Federation MLAs
20th-century Canadian politicians
1903 births
1985 deaths
People from Summerland, British Columbia